Steve Stripling (born November 25, 1953) is a retired American college football coach and former player. He was most recently the defensive line coach at the University of Cincinnati. Stripling served as interim head coach at Central Michigan University in 2009 and the University of Cincinnati in 2012. He coached Central Michigan in the 2010 GMAC Bowl and Cincinnati in the 2012 Belk Bowl, compiling an overall record of 2–0.

Head coaching record

References

1953 births
Living people
American football offensive linemen
Central Michigan Chippewas football coaches
Cincinnati Bearcats football coaches
Colorado Buffaloes football coaches
Colorado Buffaloes football players
Indiana Hoosiers football coaches
Louisville Cardinals football coaches
Michigan State Spartans football coaches
Michigan Wolverines football coaches
Minnesota Golden Gophers football coaches
North Carolina Tar Heels football coaches
Northern Illinois Huskies football coaches
Tennessee Volunteers football coaches